Zubair Khan may refer to:
 Zubair Khan (Indian politician) (born 1963), Indian National Congress politician
 Zubair Khan (Pakistani politician), member of the Provincial Assembly of Khyber Pakhtunkhwa
 Zubair Khan (cricketer) (born 1989), British cricketer
 Zubair Jahan Khan (born 1972), Pakistani squash player
 Zubair Ahmed Khan, Pakistani politician, member of the Provincial Assembly of Sindh
 Zubair Ahmad Khan, academic

See also
 Mohammad Zubair Khan, economist